In a Different Light is the début album of American country music artist Linda Davis. It was released in 1991 on Capitol Nashville. Singles released from the album include, in order: the title track, "Some Kinda Woman", and "Three Way Tie". "In a Different Light" peaked at number 61 on the Hot Country Songs charts, while "Some Kinda Woman" peaked at number 68.

Track listing
"In a Different Light" (Ed Hill, Jonathan Yudkin) – 3:29
"Some Kinda Woman" (Annette Cotter, David Leonard) – 3:25
"Three Way Tie" (Mary Beth Anderson, Lisa Silver, Carol Grace Anderson) – 3:31
"From Him to Here" (Mark D. Sanders, Verlon Thompson) – 2:49
"If Your Greener Grass Turns Blue" (Cindy Greene, Marsha Spears) – 2:58
"There's a Problem at the Office" (Annette Cotter, Kim Tribble) – 3:08
"Knowin' We'll Never Know" (Jim Rushing, James Dean Hicks) – 3:12
"White Collar Man" (Vernon Rust) – 3:08
"The Crash of 29" (Ron Moore, Billy Henderson) – 3:03
"If I Could Only Be Like You" (Kendall Franceschi, Quentin Powers, Reba McEntire) – 4:24

Personnel
From In a Different Light liner notes.

Musicians
Larry Byrom - electric guitar, acoustic guitar
John Catchings - cello
Bill Cuomo - synthesizer, keyboards
Linda Davis - lead and background vocals
Vince Gill - background vocals
John Barlow Jarvis - piano
Rick Marotta - drums
Michael Rhodes - bass guitar
Brent Rowan - electric guitar
Lisa Silver - violin, background vocals
Harry Stinson - background vocals
Billy Joe Walker, Jr. - electric guitar, acoustic guitar, classical guitar
Glenn Worf - bass guitar
Reggie Young - electric guitar

Technical
Milan Bogdan - digital editing
Jimmy Bowen - production
Linda Davis - production
John Guess - mixing
Tim Kish - overdubbing, mixing
Russ Martin - recording, overdubbing
Glenn Meadows - mastering
Ray Pillow - song selection assistance

References

1991 debut albums
Linda Davis albums
Capitol Records albums
Albums produced by Jimmy Bowen